Baker County is a county in the U.S. state of Florida. As of the 2020 census, the population was 28,259. Its county seat is Macclenny. The county was founded in 1861 and is named for James McNair Baker, a judge and Confederate Senator.

Baker County is included in the Jacksonville, FL Metropolitan Statistical Area.

In 1864, the Battle of Olustee, which was the only major American Civil War battle in Florida, was fought near Lake City in Baker County.

History
Baker County was founded in 1861. It was named for James McNair Baker (1821–1892), a judge and Confederate senator. In 1864 the Battle of Olustee was fought near Lake City in Baker County. This was the only major American Civil War battle in Florida.

Much of the area was originally covered with pine flatwoods and cypress swamps, as was Columbia County to the west. Parts of both counties are included in Osceola National Forest. A lumber industry developed here, with sawmills constructed along rivers and waterways, where lumber was brought out by water. Turpentine was also produced. These industries employed many African American laborers.

Geography
The extreme northern part of the county lies within the Okefenokee Swamp and its federally protected areas.

The St. Mary's River passes through Baker and numerous other counties. The St. Marys River is a remote blackwater river, rising in southeastern Georgia and flowing into northeastern Florida, where it forms the easternmost border between the two states.

Adjacent counties

 Charlton County, Georgia - north
 Ware County, Georgia - north
 Nassau County, Florida - northeast
 Duval County, Florida - east
 Clay County, Florida - southeast
 Union County, Florida - south
 Bradford County, Florida - south
 Columbia County, Florida - west
 Clinch County, Georgia - northwest

National protected areas
 Okefenokee National Wildlife Refuge (part)
 Osceola National Forest (part)

Major highways

Demographics

As of the 2020 United States census, there were 28,259 people, 8,828 households, and 6,448 families residing in the county.

As of the census of 2000, there were 22,259 people, 7,043 households, and 5,599 families residing in the county. There were 7,592 housing units at an average density of 13 per square mile (5/km2). The racial makeup of the county was 84.04% White, 13.92% Black or African American, 0.38% Native American, 0.40% Asian, 0.03% Pacific Islander, 0.25% from other races, and 0.98% from two or more races. 1.88% of the population were Hispanic or Latino of any race. 34.5% were of American, 9.9% Irish, 8.6% English and 6.6% German ancestry according to Census 2000. Those claiming "American" ancestry are of predominantly English ancestry but most people in Baker County who are Anglo-European tend to identify simply as American.  97.2% spoke English and 2.5% Spanish as their first language.

There were 7,043 households, out of which 41.20% had children under the age of 18 living with them, 61.70% were married couples living together, 13.10% had a female householder with no husband present, and 20.50% were non-families. 17.10% of all households were made up of individuals, and 6.90% had someone living alone who was 65 years of age or older. The average household size was 2.86 and the average family size was 3.20.

In the county, the population was spread out, with 27.50% under the age of 18, 9.90% from 18 to 24, 30.70% from 25 to 44, 22.70% from 45 to 64, and 9.20% who were 65 years of age or older. The median age was 34 years. For every 100 females there were 119.79 males. For every 100 females age 18 and over, there were 112.40 males.

The median income for a household in the county was $40,035, and the median income for a family was $43,503. Males had a median income of $30,240 versus $21,279 for females. The per capita income for the county was $15,164. About 11.40% of families and 14.70% of the population were below the poverty line, including 22.20% of those under age 18 and 8.60% of those age 65 or over.

Education
The Baker County School District serves public school students in the county.

The main library serving Baker County is the Emily Taber Public Library. The building used to be the Old Baker County Courthouse, built in 1908. The library director is April Teel.

Government

Law enforcement
The Baker County Sheriff's Office is headquartered in Macclenny, Florida. Sheriff Scotty Rhoden was first elected in 2016.

Politics

Voter registration 
As of September 1, 2020, Baker County has a Republican majority, with a Democratic minority.

Statewide elections

Industry

Baker County is home to a Walmart distribution center, several small manufacturing businesses, and Acreage Holdings, a cannabis cultivation facility. There are also several local, regional, state (the Baker Correctional Institution), and federal prisons in the western part of the county, bordering several more such facilities in Columbia County.

Communities

City
 Macclenny

Town
 Glen St. Mary

Unincorporated communities
 Baxter
 Cuyler
 Olustee
 Sanderson
 Taylor
 Black Bottom/Trail Ridge
 Two Bridges
 Eddy/Eddy Grade
 Manning

See also
 National Register of Historic Places listings in Baker County, Florida
List of counties in Florida

Notes

References

External links

Government links/Constitutional offices
 Baker County Board of County Commissioners
 Baker County Supervisor of Elections
 Baker County Property Appraiser
 Baker County Sheriff's Office
 Baker County Tax Collector

Special districts
 Baker County Schools
 Suwannee River Water Management District

Judicial branch
 Baker County Clerk of Courts
 Office of the State Attorney, 8th Judicial Circuit of Florida  serving Alachua, Baker, Bradford, Gilchrist, Levy and Union Counties
 Circuit and County Court for the 8th Judicial Circuit of Florida

Community Web Pages
 BakerCountyToday.org - Baker County, Florida: Today and Yesterday
 Baker County Community Home Page - BakerCountyFL.com - Owned and Managed from Baker County

Federal
 Okefenokee National Wildlife Refuge U.S. Fish and Wildlife Service

Museum and Library Resources
 The Baker County Press, the local newspaper for Baker County, Florida fully and openly available in the Florida Digital Newspaper Library

 
Florida counties
1861 establishments in Florida
Counties in the Jacksonville metropolitan area
North Florida
Populated places established in 1861